Mary Cordelia Montgomery Booze (1878–1955) was an American political organizer and activist. The daughter of former slaves, she was the first African-American woman to sit on the Republican National Committee. From 1924 until her death, she was the national committeewoman for her native state of Mississippi.

Biography
Born Mary Montgomery in March 1878 to parents who had been enslaved when young, she grew up in the Mississippi Delta.

Despite state restrictions that effectively disenfranchised most blacks, Booze joined the Republican Party. Beginning in 1924, she served as a committeewoman from Mississippi to the Republican National Committee, the first African-American woman to hold that position.

She became a subject of innuendo in  fierce state politics during the 1928 presidential campaign that year.

References

1878 births
1955 deaths
Straight University alumni
African-American people in Mississippi politics
Women in Mississippi politics
Mississippi Republicans
Activists for African-American civil rights
People from Mound Bayou, Mississippi
Activists from New York City
Republican National Committee members
African-American women in politics
African-American activists
20th-century African-American women
20th-century African-American people